Dan Simmons (born April 4, 1948) is an American science fiction and horror writer. He is the author of the  Hyperion Cantos and the Ilium/Olympos cycles, among other works which span the science fiction, horror, and fantasy genres, sometimes within a single novel. Simmons's genre-intermingling Song of Kali (1985) won the World Fantasy Award. He also writes mysteries and thrillers, some of which feature the continuing character Joe Kurtz.

Biography
Born in Peoria, Illinois, Simmons received a B.A. in English from Wabash College in 1970 and, in 1971, a Masters in Education from Washington University in St. Louis.

He soon started writing short stories, although his career did not take off until 1982, when, through Harlan Ellison's help, his short story "The River Styx Runs Upstream" was published and awarded first prize in a Twilight Zone Magazine story competition, and he was taken on as a client by Ellison's agent, Richard Curtis. Simmons's first novel, Song of Kali, was released in 1985.

He worked in elementary education until 1989.

Horror fiction
Summer of Night (1991) recounts the childhood of a group of pre-teens who band together in the 1960s, to defeat a centuries-old evil that terrorizes their hometown of Elm Haven, Illinois. The novel, which was praised by Stephen King in a cover blurb, is similar to King's It (1986) in its focus on small-town life, the corruption of innocence, the return of an ancient evil, and the responsibility for others that emerges with the transition from youth to adulthood.

In the sequel to Summer of Night, A Winter Haunting (2002), Dale Stewart (one of the first book's protagonists and now an adult), revisits his boyhood home to come to grips with mysteries that have disrupted his adult life.

Between the publication of Summer of Night (1991) and A Winter Haunting (2002), several additional characters from Summer of Night appeared in: Children of the Night (1992), a loose sequel to Summer of Night, which features Mike O'Rourke, now much older and a Roman Catholic priest, who is sent on a mission to investigate bizarre events in a European city; Fires of Eden (1994), in which the adult Cordie Cooke appears; and Darwin's Blade (2000), a thriller in which Dale's younger brother, Lawrence Stewart, appears as a minor character.

After Summer of Night, Simmons focused on writing science fiction until the 2007 work of historical fiction and horror, The Terror. His 2009 book Drood is based on the last years of Charles Dickens' life leading up to the writing of The Mystery of Edwin Drood, which Dickens had partially completed at the time of his death.

Historical fiction
The Terror (2007) crosses the bridge between horror and historical fiction. It is a fictionalized account of Sir John Franklin and his expedition to find the Northwest Passage.

The Abominable (2013) recounts a mid-1920s attempt on Mount Everest by five climbers—two British, one French, one Sherpa, and one American (the narrator)—to recover the body of a cousin of one the British characters.

Literary references
Many of Simmons's works have strong ties with classic literature. For example:
 His  1989 novel Hyperion, winner of Hugo and Locus Awards for the best science fiction novel, deals with a space war and is inspired in its structure by Boccaccio's Decameron and Chaucer's Canterbury Tales.
 The Hyperion Cantos take their titles from poems by the British Romantic John Keats.
 The title of Carrion Comfort, as well as many of its themes, derives from the poem "Carrion Comfort" by Gerard Manley Hopkins.
 The Hollow Man (1992) is a novel influenced by Dante's Inferno and T. S. Eliot
 "The Great Lover" (1993) is a short story inspired by the World War I War Poets
 Simmons's collection of short stories, Worlds Enough & Time, takes its name from the first line of the poem "To His Coy Mistress" by English poet Andrew Marvell: "Had we but world enough, and time"
 The detective in Flashback is named Nick Bottom after a character in Shakespeare's A Midsummer Night's Dream

Bibliography

Novels 

Hyperion Cantos series

 Hyperion (1989) – 
 The Fall of Hyperion (1990) – 
 Endymion (1996) – 
 The Rise of Endymion (1997) – 

Short stories:
 "Remembering Siri" (1983), novelette, prequel to Hyperion
 "The Death of the Centaur" (1990), novelette
 "Orphans of the Helix" (1999), novelette, sequel of The Rise of Endymion

Seasons of Horror series

 Summer of Night (1991) – 
 Children of the Night (1992) – 
 A Winter Haunting (2002) – 
 Fires of Eden (1994) – 

Short stories:
 Banished Dreams (1990), collects three prophetic dream sequences that were expurgated from the published edition of Summer of Night
 "Dale's Dream", "Kevin's Dream", "Mike's Dream"

Joe Kurtz series
 Hardcase (2001) – 
 Hard Freeze (2002) – 
 Hard as Nails (2003) – 

Ilium/Olympos series
 Ilium (2003) – 
 Olympos (2005) – 

Stand-alones
 Song of Kali (1985) – 
 Carrion Comfort (1989), expansion of the novelette published in Prayers to Broken Stones – 
 Phases of Gravity (1989) – 
 The Hollow Man (1992) – 
 The Crook Factory (1999) – 
 Darwin's Blade (2000) – 
 The Terror (2007) – 
 Drood (2009) – 
 Black Hills (2010) – 
 Flashback (2011) – 
 The Abominable (2013) – 
 The Fifth Heart (2015) – 
 Omega Canyon (2023) –

Short stories 

Collections:
 Prayers to Broken Stones (1990), collection of 6 short stories and 7 novellas/novelettes:
 "The River Styx Runs Upstream", "Eyes I Dare Not Meet in Dreams" (novelette), "Vanni Fucci Is Alive and Well and Living in Hell", "Vexed to Nightmare by a Rocking Cradle", "Remembering Siri" (novelette of Hyperion Cantos series), "Metastasis", "The Offering" (novelette), "E-Ticket to 'Namland" AKA "E-Ticket to Namland" (novelette), "Iverson's Pits" (novella), "Shave and a Haircut, Two Bites", "The Death of the Centaur" (novelette of Hyperion Cantos series), "Two Minutes Forty-Five Seconds", "Carrion Comfort" (novelette)
 Lovedeath (1993), collection of 5 novellas/novelettes:
 "Entropy's Bed at Midnight" (novelette), "Dying in Bangkok" AKA "Death in Bangkok" (novelette), "Sleeping with Teeth Women" (novella), "Flashback" (novelette), "The Great Lover" (novella)
 Worlds Enough & Time (2002), collection of 5 novellas/novelettes:
 "Looking for Kelly Dahl" (novella), "Orphans of the Helix" (novelette from Hyperion Cantos series), "The Ninth of Av" (novella), "On K2 with Kanakaredes" (novelette), "The End of Gravity" (novella)

Uncollected short stories:
 "Presents of Mind" (1986, with Edward Bryant, Steve Rasnic Tem and Connie Willis)
 "Dying Is Easy, Comedy Is Hard" (1990, with Edward Bryant), novelette
 "The Counselor" (1991), novelette
 "All Dracula's Children" (1991), novelette
 "My Private Memoirs of the Hoffer Stigmata Pandemic" (1991)
 "This Year's Class Picture" (1992)
 "Elm Haven, IL" (1992), novelette, from Freak Show series
 "One Small Step for Max" (1992)
 "My Copsa Micas" (1994), novelette
 "Madame Bovary, C'est Moi" (2000)
 "Muse of Fire" (2007), novella
 "The guiding nose of Ulfänt Banderōz" (2009), novella, from Dying Earth series

Poems 
 Ruby/Gem S.T.R.E.A.M.M. Poetry (2011)

Non-fiction 
 Going After the Rubber Chicken (1991), a collection of three convention guest-of-honor speeches by Simmons
 Summer Sketches (1992), Simmons reveals how his travel experiences have allowed him to instill a feeling of place in readers of his fiction
 Negative Spaces: Two talks (1999), about science fiction

Adaptations

In January 2004, it was announced that the screenplay he wrote for his novels Ilium and Olympos would be made into a film by Digital Domain and Barnet Bain Films, with Simmons acting as executive producer. Ilium is described as an "epic tale that spans 5,000 years and sweeps across the entire solar system, including themes and characters from Homer's The Iliad and Shakespeare's The Tempest."

In 2008, Guillermo del Toro was scheduled to direct a film adaptation of Drood for Universal Pictures. As of December 2017, the project is still listed as "in development."

In 2009, Scott Derrickson was set to direct "Hyperion Cantos" for Warner Bros. and Graham King, with Trevor Sands penning the script to blend the first two cantos Hyperion and The Fall of Hyperion into one film.  In 2011, actor Bradley Cooper expressed interest in taking over the adaptation. In 2015, it was announced that TV channel Syfy will produce a mini-series based on the Hyperion Cantos with the involvement of Cooper and King. As of May 2017, the project was still "in development" at Syfy. On November 1, 2021, Cooper and King restarted the feature film adaptation at Warner Bros. with Tom Spezialy set to write the script.

The Terror (2007) was adapted in 2018 as an AMC 10 episode-mini-series in 2018 and received generally positive reviews upon release.

Awards

Wins

Locus Award
 Best Horror Novel (1990): Carrion Comfort
 Best Science Fiction Novel (1990): Hyperion
 Best Novelette (1991): "Entropy's Bed at Midnight"
 Best Science Fiction Novel (1991): The Fall of Hyperion
 Best Horror/Dark Fantasy Novel (1992): Summer of Night
 Best Horror/Dark Fantasy Novel (1993): Children of the Night
 Best Novelette (1994): "Dying in Bangkok"
 Best Horror/Dark Fantasy Novel (1995): Fires of Eden
 Best Science Fiction Novel (1998): The Rise of Endymion
 Best Novelette (2000): "Orphans of the Helix"
 Best Science Fiction Novel (2004): Ilium

International Horror Guild Award
 Best Novel (2003): A Winter Haunting
Nocte Award
 Best Foreign Short Story (2010): “La foto de la clase de este año” (This Year's Class Picture).
Seiun Award
 Best Foreign Novel (1995): Hyperion
 Best Novel (1996): The Fall of Hyperion (tied with Timelike Infinity by Stephen Baxter)
 Best Foreign Short Story (1999): "This Year's Class Picture"

Nominations
Dan Simmons has been nominated on numerous occasions in a range of categories for his fiction, including the Arthur C. Clarke Award, Bram Stoker Award, British Fantasy Society Award, Hugo Award, Nebula Award, and World Fantasy Award.

Selected nominations are listed below.

Locus nominations:

The Hollow Man (1992) – Locus Award nominee, 1993

The Winter Haunting (2002) – Locus Award nominee, 2003

Olympos (2005) – Locus Award shortlist, 2006

References

External links

 Interview by BookBanter
 Dan Simmons on Worlds Without End
 
 
 
 

1948 births
20th-century American novelists
21st-century American novelists
American horror writers
American male novelists
American male short story writers
American science fiction writers
American short story writers
Hugo Award-winning writers
Living people
Novelists from Illinois
Wabash College alumni
Washington University in St. Louis alumni
World Fantasy Award-winning writers
Writers from Peoria, Illinois
20th-century American male writers
21st-century American male writers